Linville Historic District is a historic school campus and national historic district located at Linville, Avery County, North Carolina. It encompasses 96 contributing buildings and 4 contributing structures in the historic core of Linville. The buildings date between about 1892 and 1940, and include shingle-or chestnut bark-covered resort buildings and the second generation of houses flanking the first and eighteenth fairways of the golf course. Notable buildings include the Hemlock Cottage, Dormiecroft, "Honeymoon" Cottage, Presbyterian Church, The Studio, the VanLandingham House, and All Saints Episcopal Church.

It was listed on the National Register of Historic Places in 1979.

References

Historic districts on the National Register of Historic Places in North Carolina
Buildings and structures in Avery County, North Carolina
National Register of Historic Places in Avery County, North Carolina